Émile Masson may refer to:
Émile Masson (writer) (1869–1923), Breton writer and thinker
Émile Masson (cyclist) (1888–1973), Belgian cyclist
Émile Masson Jr. (1915–2011), Belgian cyclist